Regional Atacama was a Chilean football club based in the city of Copiapó, Atacama Region. The club was founded in 1979, playing a total of six season at the top level of Chilean football during its 18-year existence.

In 1998, the club was folded due to financial difficulties.

Deportes Copiapó took their place as the Copiapó city local team in 1999.

Achievements
6 seasons in Primera División
12 seasons in Segunda División

See also
 Deportes Copiapó

References
 RSSSF.com

Football clubs in Chile
Defunct football clubs in Chile
Association football clubs established in 1979
Association football clubs disestablished in 1998
Sport in Atacama Region
1979 establishments in Chile
1998 disestablishments in Chile